Enzo Couacaud and Andrew Harris were the defending champions but chose not to defend their title.

Luke Johnson and Sem Verbeek won the title after defeating Gabriel Décamps and Alex Rybakov 6–2, 6–2 in the final.

Seeds

Draw

References

External links
 Main draw

Coosa Valley Open - Doubles